International Cricket Stadium or Jay Kaylon Ground is a cricket ground in Kota, Rajasthan. The ground as established in 1974 with name of Municipal Stadium. The ground regularly hosts Ranji matches for Rajasthan cricket team. Till date the ground has hosted six first-class matches and a List A match between Wills XI and Uttar Pradesh cricket team.

In 2006, Government of Rajasthan made and cleared the proposals to upgrade ground into international cricket venue in the city as  sum a Rs 18.59 crore cleared for proposal which include built the pavilion and playing field to international standards.

The ground is set to play host to RCL T20 2016 from 16 February to 24 February with six teams from all across Rajasthan and 18 matches, in total.

References

External links 
 Cricketarchive
 Cricinfo
 Yahoo

Buildings and structures in Kota, Rajasthan
Multi-purpose stadiums in India
Sports venues in Rajasthan
Cricket grounds in Rajasthan
1974 establishments in Rajasthan
Sports venues completed in 1974
20th-century architecture in India